Premium Outlet Collection is a  Canadian outlet shopping mall in Leduc County just east of Edmonton International Airport. It opened on May 2, 2018, after being delayed from fall 2017. It was developed by Ivanhoé Cambridge and Simon Property Group. The mall has around 100 retailers and the main anchors are Designer Shoe Warehouse, H&M, Nike Factory Store, Old Navy Outlet, Urban Planet (Formally Forever 21), and Marshalls.

References

External links
Official website

Outlet malls in Canada
Power centres (retail) in Canada
Shopping malls in Alberta
Shopping malls established in 2018
Tourist attractions in Edmonton
Ivanhoé Cambridge
2018 establishments in Alberta